Cytinus hypocistis is an ant-pollinated species of parasitic plant in the family Cytinaceae having four subspecies. It is found primarily in locations that surround the Mediterranean Sea, and is the type for the genus Cytinus. The binomial has been conserved.

Distribution

Cytinus hypocistis is native to Albania; Algeria; Crete; Croatia; Cyprus; Greece; France (including Corsica); Israel; Italy (including Sardinia and Sicily); Lebanon; Libya; Malta; Morocco; Portugal; Spain (including both the Balearic and Canary Islands); Syria; Tunisia; and Turkey.

The subspecies macranthus is native to Portugal and western Spain; orientalis is native to southern Greece and Crete; and pityusensis is endemic to Ibiza of the Balearic Islands.

Uses
Cytinus hypocistis has been used in traditional medicine to treat dysentery and tumors of the throat, and has been used for its astringent qualities.

References

External links 
 

Cytinaceae
Plants described in 1753
Taxa named by Carl Linnaeus
Flora of France
Flora of Albania
Flora of Algeria
Flora of Crete
Flora of Croatia
Flora of Cyprus
Flora of Corsica
Flora of Greece
Flora of Israel
Flora of Italy
Flora of Sardinia
Flora of Sicily
Flora of Lebanon and Syria
Flora of Palestine (region)
Flora of Libya
Flora of Morocco
Flora of Portugal
Flora of Spain
Flora of the Balearic Islands
Flora of the Canary Islands
Flora of Tunisia